Limpertsberg is a quarter in north-western Luxembourg City, in the centre of Luxembourg.

In the south, on the border with the main city is the Glacis, a large open air parking lot which hosts the annual Schueberfouer fair, the largest fair in the country. Next to the Glacis is the Grand Théâtre de Luxembourg. 

Limpertsberg's Notre-Dame cemetery has a Monument de la résistance et de la déportation (Monument of the national resistance and deportation). The cemetery features the bronze sculpture of The Political Prisoner by Luxembourg's best-known sculptor Lucien Wercollier.  The Limpertsberg bronze is one of three casts of the sculpture, with the other two at the Musée national de la résistance (National Resistance Museum) in Esch-sur-Alzette and the National Monument to the Resistance and to the Deportation at Notre-Dame cemetery in Luxembourg City.

To the south east is another iconic landmark, the Grand Duchess Charlotte Bridge, also known as the Red Bridge due to its colour. It connects Limpertsberg to the European district of Kirchberg, passing over the City quarter of Pfaffenthal and the Alzette river.

Limpertsberg also has several educational institutions such as, parts of the University of Luxembourg, the Lycée de garçons (LGL), the Lycée Robert Schuman, the Lycée Vauban, the Lycée Technique des Arts et Métiers, the Lycée Technique du Centre, the Lycée Technique Michel Lucius, the French school as well as the Waldorf school.

The district also houses St Joseph's Roman Catholic church completed in the Neo-Romanesque style in 1913.

, Limpertsberg had a population of about 10,941 inhabitants.

References

Quarters of Luxembourg City